Kelley Point Park is a city park in north Portland in the U.S. state of Oregon. Bounded by the Columbia Slough on the south, the Willamette River on the west, and the Columbia River on the north, the park forms the tip of the peninsula at the confluence of the rivers. Marine Terminal 6 of the Port of Portland lies immediately east of the park along the Columbia, while Terminal 5 is along the Willamette slightly south of the Columbia Slough. Sauvie Island is west of the park across the Willamette River. Hayden Island is slightly upstream of the park on the Columbia River opposite Marine Terminal 6.

Description and history
The city acquired the park site in 1984 from the Port of Portland, which had covered much of the peninsula with dredged material from the Columbia River to create places to build terminals. The site was formerly part of Pearcy Island, separated from the mainland by sloughs, one of which was called Pearcy Slough. Pearcy Island still appears on topographical maps at  even though it is no longer an island. Pearcy Island and Pearcy Slough were named after Nathan Pearcy, who settled a donation land claim on the island in 1850. Development projects later altered the landforms in this vicinity.

The north tip of Pearcy Island had no name until 1926, when a group of Portland citizens persuaded the United States Board on Geographic Names to name it Kelley Point. The name honors Hall Jackson Kelley (1790–1874), a New England resident who during the first half of the 19th century promoted interest in Oregon and the Pacific Northwest. During a brief visit to Oregon in 1834, Kelley tried unsuccessfully to establish a city at the confluence.

Park amenities include a historical site, paved and unpaved paths, picnic tables, public art, restrooms, and a vista point. The  park, operated by the Portland Parks & Recreation Department, is open from 6 a.m. to 9 p.m. Kelley Point was once the site of a small lighthouse.

Wildlife includes Bewick's wrens that frequent the park's black cottonwood forest. Caspian terns, osprey, double-crested cormorants, and gulls are common near the rivers. Sights from the vista point include ship traffic on both rivers. An informal Columbia Slough canoe launch lies near the park entrance along Kelley Point Park Road, west of Interstate 5 along North Marine Drive. The 40-Mile Loop hiking and biking trail runs by the entrance to the park.

References

Works cited
 Houck, Mike, and Cody, M.J., eds. (2000). Wild in the City. Portland, Oregon: Oregon Historical Society Press. .
 McArthur, Lewis A.; McArthur, Lewis L. (2003). Oregon Geographic Names, Seventh Edition. Portland, Oregon: Oregon Historical Society Press.

External links

 

1984 establishments in Oregon
Parks in Portland, Oregon
Protected areas established in 1984
St. Johns, Portland, Oregon
Urban public parks